Point of View is a 1965 American short documentary film. It was nominated for an Academy Award for Best Documentary Short.

See also
List of American films of 1965

References

External links

1965 films
1960s short documentary films
American short documentary films
1960s English-language films
1960s American films